An indeterminate pronoun is a pronoun which can show a variety of readings depending on the type of sentence it occurs in. The term "indeterminate pronoun" originates in Kuroda's (1965) thesis and is typically used in reference to wh-indeterminates, which are pronouns which function as an interrogative pronoun in questions, yet come to have additional meanings with other grammatical operators.  For example, in Japanese, dare means 'who' in a constituent question like (1) formed with the question-forming operator no:

However, in a statement (2), in combination with the particle ka, dare 'who' acquires an existential 'someone' meaning:

With yet another particle -mo, dare 'who' expresses a universal meaning as in (3):

Languages with wh-indeterminates are typologically very common, and this is a characteristic of many language families such as Uralic, Turkic, Dravidian, and the Slavic sub-branch of Indo-European. The syntactic and semantic properties of indeterminate pronouns and their interactions with different grammatical operators is a major topic within the study of the syntax-semantics interface.

See also 
 Alternative semantics
 Free choice inference
 Indefinite pronoun
 Wh-movement

References 

Pronouns
Interrogative words and phrases
Generative syntax
Semantics
Linguistics terminology